Realization or realisation may refer to:

 Realization (album), a 1973 album by Eddie Henderson
 Realization (climb), a sport climbing route in Ceüse, France
 Realization (figured bass), the creating of a musical accompaniment from a figured bass
 Realization (finance), the pricing of security at market value 
 Realization (linguistics), the production of an actual form in a human language from an abstract representation
 Realization (metrology), a physical form of a measurement standard
 Realization (probability), an actually observed value of random variable
 Realization (systems), a state space model implementing a given input-output behavior 
 Realization (tax), one of the principles for defining income for tax purposes in the U.S.
 Realization of an apeirogon, a mapping of an abstract apeirogon

See also
 Realize (disambiguation)
 Self-realization, a psychological or spiritual change in one's sense of self